Ecuador competed at the 2020 Summer Olympics in Tokyo. Originally scheduled to take place from 24 July to 9 August 2020, the Games have been postponed to 23 July to 8 August 2021, because of the COVID-19 pandemic. It was the nation's fifteenth appearance at the Summer Olympics, and its most successful to date. The country won its third, fourth, and fifth ever medals (and its second and third ever gold medals), two golds and one silver, respectively, during the games.

Medalists

Competitors
The following is the list of number of competitors participating in the Games:

Archery

One Ecuadorian archer qualified for the women's individual recurve at the Games by securing the last of three available spots as the next highest-ranked eligible placer at the 2021 Pan American Championships in Monterrey, Mexico, signifying the country's debut in the sport.

Athletics

Ecuadorian athletes further achieved the entry standards, either by qualifying time or by world ranking, in the following track and field events (up to a maximum of 3 athletes in each event):

Track and road events
Men

Women

Boxing

Ecuador entered four boxers (two per gender) to compete in each of the following weight classes into the Olympic tournament. With the cancellation of the 2021 Pan American Qualification Tournament in Buenos Aires, Jean Carlos Caicedo (men's featherweight) and two-time Olympian Julio Castillo (men's heavyweight) finished among the top five of their respective weight divisions to secure their places on the Ecuadorian squad based on the IOC's Boxing Task Force Rankings for the Americas. On the women's side, María José Palacios (lightweight) and Erika Pachito (middleweight) completed the nation's boxing lineup by topping the list of eligible boxers from the Americas in their respective weight divisions of the IOC's Boxing Task Force Rankings.

Cycling

Road
Ecuador entered two riders to compete in the men's Olympic road race, by virtue of their top 50 national finish (for men) in the UCI World Ranking.

BMX
Ecuador received one men's and one women's quota spot each for BMX at the Olympics, as a result of the nation's ninth-place finish for men in the UCI BMX Olympic Qualification List and a top three eligible placement for women in the UCI BMX Individual Ranking List of June 1, 2021.

Equestrian

With Chile failing to comply with the minimum eligibility requirements, Ecuador received an invitation from FEI to send an eventing rider to the Games, as the next highest-ranked eligible nation within the individual FEI Olympic Rankings for Group E (Central and South America).

Eventing

Golf

Ecuador entered one female golfer into the Olympic tournament. Daniela Darquea (world no. 349) qualified directly among the top 60 eligible players for their respective events based on the IGF World Rankings.

Judo
 
Ecuador entered three judoka (one man and two women) for each of the following weight classes at the Games. Rio 2016 Olympian Lenin Preciado (men's extra-lightweight, 60 kg) and rookie Vanessa Chalá (women's half-heavyweight, 78 kg) were selected among the top 18 judoka of their respective weight classes based on the IJF World Ranking List of June 28, 2021, while two-time Olympian Estefania García (women's half-middleweight, 63 kg) accepted a continental berth from the Americas as the nation's top-ranked judoka outside of direct qualifying position.

Modern pentathlon
 
Ecuador qualified one modern pentathlete for the women's event, signifying the country's Olympic debut in the sport. Marcela Cuaspud secured a selection by finishing among the top two for Latin America and thirteen overall at the 2019 Pan American Games in Lima.

Shooting

Ecuadorian shooters achieved quota places for the following events by virtue of their best finishes at the 2018 ISSF World Championships, the 2019 ISSF World Cup series, the 2019 Pan American Games, and Championships of the Americas, as long as they obtained a minimum qualifying score (MQS) by May 31, 2020.

Surfing

Ecuador sent one surfer to compete in the women's shortboard race at the Games. Mimi Barona secured a spot previously allocated by the defending champion Daniella Rosas, as the next highest-ranked surfer vying for qualification, following her silver-medal finish at the 2019 Pan American Games in Lima, Peru.

Swimming

Ecuador received a universality invitation from FINA to send two top-ranked swimmers (one per gender) in their respective individual events to the Olympics, based on the FINA Points System of June 28, 2021.

Table tennis
 
For the first time since Barcelona 1992, Ecuador entered one athlete into the table tennis competition at the Games. Alberto Miño scored a second-stage final triumph to earn one of the remaining two tickets in the men's singles at the 2021 Latin American Qualification Tournament in Rosario, Argentina.

Triathlon
 
Ecuador has entered one triathlete to compete at the Games.

Weightlifting

Ecuador entered four female weightlifters into the Olympic competition. Rio 2016 Olympian Neisi Dajomes (women's 76 kg), rookies Angie Palacios (women's 64 kg) and Tamara Salazar (women's 87 kg), with Alexandra Escobar leading the squad at her fifth straight Games, secured one of the top eight slots each in their respective weight divisions based on the IWF Absolute World Ranking.

Wrestling

Ecuador qualified two wrestlers for each of the following classes into the Olympic competition. One of them secured a place in the women's freestyle 50 kg by progressing to the top two finals at the 2021 World Qualification Tournament in Sofia, Bulgaria. 

On June 15, 2021, United World Wrestling awarded an additional Olympic license to Luisa Valverde in the women's freestyle 53 kg, as the next highest-ranked wrestler vying for qualification at the 2019 Worlds, citing North Korea's withdrawal from the Games.

Freestyle

See also 
 Ecuador at the 2019 Pan American Games

References 

Nations at the 2020 Summer Olympics
2020
2021 in Ecuadorian sport